Methacton School District (MSD) is a public school district located in Montgomery County, Pennsylvania, in the Philadelphia metropolitan area. It is headquartered in the Farina Education Center in Worcester Township.

The school district includes residents in the townships of Lower Providence (including the census-designated places of Audubon, Eagleville and Trooper) and Worcester (including the area of Fairview Village). The district was created in 1961, as a consolidation of other school districts, with the merger process completed in 1969. The superintendent is Dr. David Zerbe. The name of the district is a word in a Native American language that refers to the area hill.

Seven schools comprise the district:
 Methacton High School (9th-12th grade)
 Arcola Intermediate School (7th and 8th grade)
 Skyview Upper Elementary School (5th and 6th grade)
 Arrowhead Elementary School (K-4th grade)
 Eagleville Elementary School (K-4th grade)
 Woodland Elementary School (K-4th grade)
 Worcester Elementary School (K-4th grade)

See also 
 List of school districts in Pennsylvania

References

External links
 

School districts in Montgomery County, Pennsylvania
School districts established in 1961